1965 saw the revival of the world’s oldest motor race when the Royal Automobile Club brought the 30th RAC International Tourist Trophy Race with the Senior Service Trophy to Oulton Park. The TT, was the fourth round of the International Championship for Manufacturers (Division III). In addition, it was also round three of the British Sports Car Championship. This was the held at the Oulton Park circuit, in Cheshire, England, on 1 May.

Report

Entry
A total of 30 sports cars were entered for the event, across two classes, however just 25 took part in qualifying.

Qualifying
The reigning World Drivers Champion, John Surtees took pole position for this own outfit, Team Surtees, in his Lola-Chevrolet T70, averaging a speed of 103.495 mph, around 2.761 miles circuit.

Race
The final was held over four hour duration of the Oulton Park circuit, split into two heats of two hours. Denny Hulme took impressive overall victory, after winning the first heat in his Sidney Taylor Racing prepared Brabham-Climax BT8, and subsequently taking a second place in the second heat. Hulme won in an aggregated time of 4hrs 03:01.400mins., averaging a speed of 94.618 mph. Second place went to David Hobbs, in his Lola-Ford T70. The podium was completed by David Piper, in his Ferrari 250 LM. Hulme victory was his first win in the TT, he would go on and win a total of four, the last being in 1986.

Classification

Aggregate Results

 Fastest lap: Bruce McLaren, 1:39.000secs. (100.400 mph)

Heat 1

Heat 2

References

RAC
RAC Tourist Trophy
RAC Tourist Trophy